Saint-Pancrace may refer to two communes of France:
 Saint-Pancrace, Dordogne, in the region of Aquitaine
 Saint-Pancrace, Savoie, in the region of Rhône-Alpes

See also
 St. Pancras (disambiguation)